The Land Rover Freelander is a compact luxury crossover SUV that was manufactured and marketed by Land Rover from 1997 to 2015. The second generation was sold from 2007 to 2015 in North America and the Middle East as the LR2 and in Europe as the Freelander 2. The Freelander was sold in both two-wheel and four-wheel drive versions. The name 'Freelander' is derived from the combination of 'Freedom' and 'Lander'.

After having built exclusively body-on-frame 4WD vehicles for half a century, the first generation Freelander was the brand's first model to use monocoque (unibody) structures, and was offered in three- and five-door body options, including a semi soft-top. The second generation (from 2006) dropped all two-door options, leaving only a five-door stationwagon-like body, and – after 62 years – became the brand's first ever to offer a two-wheel drive option (as of 2010).

After a five-year hiatus, the two-door Freelanders were succeeded by the two-door versions of the Range Rover Evoque in 2011, and the five-door generation 2 was replaced by the Discovery Sport in 2015, the nameplate spanning two generations and less than eighteen years.

First generation (L314; 1997–2006)

Development
In 1988, British Aerospace acquired the Rover Group for £150 million, which allowed resources across Rover brands and Land Rover to be pooled differently, and the idea of developing a smaller Land Rover became more attainable than previously.

When the board approved the Pathfinder project, it was codenamed CB40 (after Canley Building 40, where the concept was initially developed).

Launch
Remarkably, the new, compact Land Rover had become almost as long as the original Range Rover, that had been phased out just the year before, and even sported an inch (2.5 cm) longer wheelbase.

Production
When BMW acquired Rover Group, they terminated the agreement, and instead funded production facilities at Solihull, making use of the Rover SD1 assembly hall which had been inactive in the early 1980s, when Rover car production was moved to Cowley.

Popularity
The Mk1 Land Rover Freelander was an instant hit and went on to become the biggest-selling four-wheel-drive model in Europe, with over 540,000 units sold over its nine-year lifespan. The Freelander became Europe's best-selling 4WD vehicle for five consecutive years after launch in 1997; and in 2016 Land Rover embraced it as its 8th 'Heritage vehicle'.

Model variations 

There were a variety of models, based around five-door estate and three-door softback (semi-convertible), hardback, and commercial (van-like) versions. In 2004, Land Rover introduced an improved and upgraded version of the Mark I; changes included a new interior and major external revisions, including a new face and rear.

The three-door model was available in E, S, ES, Sport and Sport Premium trim and the five-door model in available in E, S, ES, HSE, Sport and Sport Premium trim.

Engines 
Engine choices included:
 1.8-litre I4 Rover K-series petrol (1997–2006), badged as '1.8i', 'Xi' or 'XEi' (Not sold in North America)
 2.0-litre I4 Rover L-series diesel (1997–2000), badged as 'Di', 'XDi' or 'XEDi'
 2.0-litre I4 BMW M47 diesel (2001–2006), badged as 'Td4'
 2.5-litre V6 Rover KV6 Engine petrol (2001–2006), badged as 'V6'

Manual gearboxes dominated the early models, but automatic Tiptronic-style gearboxes (Jatco JF506E) became increasingly popular and were standard on the V6. The Automatic Tiptronic gearbox was also available as an option on the Td4.

Marketing 
The first generation Freelander was marketed as a premium compact 4x4, and used in the 1998 Camel Trophy and participated in Land Rover's G4 Challenge. The vehicle represented a compromise because it did not have a low-range gear selection, nor a locking differential, as found on larger Land Rover models. This meant that in comparison to other Land Rovers, off-road performance was not as good. In comparison to similar models produced by other manufacturers in the same period of time like the Honda CRV or the Toyota RAV4, however, the first generation Freelander was far more competent off-road.

It had more than sixteen patented features, including the IRD or Intermediate Reduction Drive, which acted as a front differential and fixed ratio transfer; the VCU or viscous-coupling, which reacts to the differing rotational speed of the prop shafts, allowing varying torque across itself; and the Hill Descent Control system, which was then implemented in the rest of the Land Rover range and even in the first generation BMW X5 (BMW was the parent company of Rover Group at the time of introduction of this model).

This first generation also used a Traction Control system and a special version of ABS produced by Wabco, modified to assist driving in off-road situations. Lack of the MG Rover K18 and KV6 engines after the end of the MG Rover production led Land Rover to discontinue the model on 31 August 2005 in the U.S. and Canada.

Freelander 2 (L359; 2006–2015) 

The second generation was internally designated L359; debuted at the 2006 British International Motor Show and was marketed as the Freelander 2, retaining the Freelander name in Europe and marketed as the LR2 in North America and the Middle East – mirroring the marketing of the new third generation Land Rover Discovery as LR3. A presentation at the Kensington Roof Gardens was held for journalists featuring celebrity tennis player Maria Sharapova. Production ended in January 2015.

The second generation Freelander is based on the Ford EUCD platform, which itself is based on the Ford C1 platform. The Ford EUCD platform will be used by more upcoming vehicles from Volvo. The engine range is all-new for Freelander, featuring transversely-mounted 3.2-litre straight-six engine of the Volvo SI6 series, which debuted in the new Volvo S80, as well as the 2.2-litre DW12 common rail turbodiesel engine from PSA Peugeot Citroën.

Unlike previous Land Rovers, the second generation Freelander is manufactured in the Halewood Body & Assembly facility, near Liverpool, and was until 2009 manufactured alongside the Jaguar X-Type – as Jaguar X-Type and Landrover Freelander both used modified version of Ford's front wheel drive platform. The new Freelander features higher ground clearance and off-road capabilities that are closer to other Land Rover models.

The second generation has improved quality interior with more safety features as standard. The Freelander 2 features a modified version of the Terrain Response off-road driving system as fitted to the Discovery 3 and the Range Rover. The 4WD system was developed in conjunction with Haldex and was called Third generation coupling. Vehicles from the 2009 model year are fitted with a modified design of the active on-demand coupling, known as Haldex's Fourth generation.

The new Freelander was first marketed in the U.S. in 2007 as the LR2. The 2008 version is called the LR2 HSE. The limited run HST had added side trim, front valance, and 19-inch wheels. A Volvo 3.2-litre inline six-cylinder engine producing  is standard, with a six-speed automatic transmission and all-wheel drive. In the United Kingdom, the standard engine is the PSA 2.2-litre turbo diesel.

Interior appointments include an Alpine 440-watt 14-speaker surround sound audio and a 7-inch touch navigation screen options, while the newer models can be equipped with an Meridian audio system, which comes with a surround sound 17-speaker system with Trifield technology, producing 825 watts.

The Meridian system is also equipped with subwoofers and Audyssey MultEQ audio tuning system. Also a 5-inch colour display screen is standard even at the newer entry-level models. An optional cold climate package includes heated front windscreen, heated front seats with two heating levels and heated windscreen washers. The optional lighting package includes bi-xenon headlights, adaptive front-lighting, memory for the driver seat, as well as exterior mirrors and approach and puddle lamps.

Freelander 2 TD4_e
The Freelander TD4_e features stop-start technology to improve fuel economy and reduce carbon emissions. The system cuts out the engine when the vehicle is stationary, neutral is selected and the clutch engaged; the engine restarts when the clutch pedal is depressed.

The system includes a heavy-duty starter motor that also acts as a generator to recover energy through regenerative braking that is then stored in capacitors to restart the engine reducing stress on the vehicle's battery and electrical system. The stop-start system became available in spring 2009 on Freelander 2 TD4 models.

Freelander 2 eD4
For the first time in Land Rover's history, from the 2011 model year, a purely two-wheel drive version, badged eD4, was available. This model also dropped the Terrain Response and Hill Descent Control systems.

After introduction of the Range Rover Evoque in 2011, this model competed with the Freelander 2, especially with the eD4, as the Evoque was both cheaper to purchase, more efficient, more premium, and combined this with standard four-wheel drive.

For the 2013 model year, the Freelander got a revised look with a different grille, and new interior trim.

Sales

References

External links

 at Land Rover International

Freelander
Compact sport utility vehicles
Crossover sport utility vehicles
All-wheel-drive vehicles
Ford C1 platform
2000s cars
2010s cars
Cars introduced in 1997